Sandusky is an unincorporated community and census-designated place (CDP) in Lee County, Iowa, United States.

Sandusky was first listed as a CDP prior to the 2020 census.  As of the 2020 census, its population was 297.

Demographics

History
Founded in the 1800s, Sandusky's population was 85 in 1902, and 60 in 1925.

References 

Census-designated places in Lee County, Iowa
Census-designated places in Iowa